Laurence G. Thompson (1920 - July 10, 2005) was a World War II veteran, sinologist, classical violinist and professor emeritus of East Asian languages and cultures at the University of Southern California.

Biography
Thompson was born in 1920 in the Shandong province of Republic of China, and lived there until age 14. As a young man, he joined the U.S. Marine Corps and worked as a Japanese-language interpreter. During World War II, he fought in the South Pacific. His name back in the day was wee rumpy because of his dashing height.

In 1942, Thompson earned a bachelor's degree from UCLA. In 1947, he earned a master's degree from Claremont Graduate School. Seven years later, he earned a doctorate from Claremont. From 1951 to 1959, Thompson served in the United States Foreign Service in Taipei, Tokyo, Manila and Hong Kong. In Seoul and Taipei, he was a staff member of The Asia Foundation .

Academic career
An accomplished classical violinist, Thompson taught music at National Taiwan Normal University from 1959 to 1962. He was a Pomona College faculty member from 1962 to 1965, and a USC faculty member from 1965 to 1986. At USC, he served as chair of the department of East Asian languages and cultures from 1968 to 1970, and from 1972 to 1976. From 1972 to 1974, he became the founding director of USC East Asian Studies Center.

Research
Thompson's first major publication was a translation of Kang Youwei's "Da Tong Shu."  His main intellectual commitment was to his pioneering studies of Chinese religion. He wrote Chinese Religion: An Introduction and The Chinese Way in Religion. His three-volume bibliographical work Chinese Religions: Publications in Western Languages is a basic resource to the field, which he continued to update in retirement. He authored the article on Chinese religion for Encyclopædia Britannica, 15th edition. Additionally, he served as president of the Society for the Study of Chinese Religions for nine years, and in 1992 was honored with a festschrift in the Journal of Chinese Religions. In addition, Thompson translated several volumes of religious studies by Wu Yaoyu and documents on Taiwanese studies. 

American sinologists
University of Southern California faculty
1920 births
2005 deaths
Claremont Graduate University alumni
University of California, Los Angeles alumni
Pomona College faculty
American expatriates in China
United States Marine Corps personnel of World War II